Shiv Chandra Chaudhary is a Nepalese politician from Nepali Congress. Chaudhary is a resident of Nagarain, who is elected member of Provincial Assembly of Madhesh Province.

See also 

 Bimalendra Nidhi
 Ram Saroj Yadav

References

External links

Living people
Madhesi people
Members of the Provincial Assembly of Madhesh Province
People from Dhanusha District
Nepali Congress politicians from Madhesh Province
1949 births